Tasman (often known as the Tasman Mako and formerly Tasman Makos) are a New Zealand professional rugby union team based in Tasman Bay / Te Tai-o-Aorere, New Zealand. Established in 2006, they play in the National Provincial Championship. They play their home games at Lansdowne Park in Blenheim or Trafalgar Park in Nelson, both in the Tasman region. The team is affiliated with the Crusaders Super Rugby franchise. Their home playing colours are red and blue.

Current squad
The Tasman Mako squad for the 2022 Bunnings NPC.

Honours

Tasman have been overall Champions twice, winning the title in 2019 and 2020. Their full list of honours include:

ITM Cup Championship Division
Winners: 2013

Mitre 10 Cup Premiership Division
Winners: 2019, 2020

Current Super Rugby players
Players named in the 2022 Tasman Mako squad, who also earned contracts or were named in a squad for any side participating in the 2022 Super Rugby Pacific season.

References

External links
Tasman Mako official website
Bunnings NPC official website

National Provincial Championship
New Zealand rugby union teams
Sport in the Nelson Region
Sport in the Tasman District